Tommaso Fiore (7 March 1884 – 4 June 1973) was an Italian meridionalist writer and a socialist intellectual and politician. He is known for his attention and his descriptions and studies on the inhumane conditions of Southern Italian and often specifically Apulian peasants at that time. He is also known for his Viareggio Prize-winning book Un popolo di formiche ("A people of ants"). In the 1920s, he was appointed as mayor of his hometown Altamura. During the twenty-year period of the Italian Fascist era, he strenuously opposed the regime before being sent into internal exile in 1942 and then being jailed in 1943.

Life 

Tommaso Fiore was born in a working-class family on 7 March 1884. After completing higher education in a seminary school located in Conversano (as it was normal at that time for gifted students who couldn't afford public high schools), he studied classical literature at university and then he taught inside Italian classical lyceum schools. His interest were mostly focused on the poverty of Southern Italy's peasants and he struggled with his thoughts to find a solution to Southern Italy's economic failure (in Italian such scholars are called ). He was also a strenuous socialist and he always fought for Independence and federalism of Southern Italy. He also studied the poverty and other issues related to Southern Italy's peasants. In 1920s he became mayor of Altamura, his hometown and he was a courageous opponent of fascism. He was sent into internal exile in 1942 and then jailed in 1943 because of his intense propaganda against fascism.

On 19 August 1909, he also joined the Italian Freemasonry and he was appointed to the Masonic lodge number 1799 located in Altamura. On 7 February 1915, he was appointed as Master Mason.

He collaborated with Italian newspaper La Rivoluzione liberale whose chief editor was Piero Gobetti, and with newspaper Quarto Stato founded by Pietro Nenni and Carlo Rosselli, where he explained his ideas about socialist reformation of Southern Italy.

On 28 July 1943, he lost his son Graziano in the massacre of via Niccolò dell'Arca, in Bari, carried out by fascists. In the aftermath of World War II, he was appointed as Latin grammar and literature teacher at the University of Bari, where he also became Provveditore degli Studi ("Superintendent of Studies"). In 1952, his book Un popolo di formiche (which means "a people of ants") won the prestigious Viareggio Prize.

Works 
 
 
  inside

See also 
 Meridionalism
 Il cafone all'inferno
 Southern Italy
 Apulia
 Land reform#Italy

References

Bibliography

External links 
 Exhibition of documents and photographs, by Altamuran association Il circolo delle formiche
 Parco Letterario Formiche di Puglia dedicated to Tommaso Fiore

1884 births
1973 deaths
Italian Freemasons
Italian socialists
Italian male writers
Mayors of places in Apulia
People from Altamura
Viareggio Prize winners